François Masson (born 15 November 1979) is a retired French footballer who played as a midfielder.

Career
A native of Rennes, Masson began playing youth football with Stade Rennais F.C. and Angers SCO. He made his senior football debut with Pontivy GS, scoring 13 goals in 32 matches. Then, he signed his first professional contract with AS Cannes. After the club was relegated from Ligue 2, he joined Dijon FCO in 2002.

Masson immediately established himself in Dijon's first team, helping the club reach the semi-finals of the 2003–04 Coupe de France and achieve promotion to Ligue 2 during the 2003–04 season. After five seasons with Dijon, when manager Rudi Garcia (who had brought him to the club) left, Masson left for Stade Brestois 29.

References

External links

Profile at Soccerway

1979 births
Living people
Footballers from Rennes
Association football midfielders
French footballers
Angers SCO players
AS Cannes players
Dijon FCO players
Stade Brestois 29 players
GSI Pontivy players